The Norwegian Christian Student and School Association (Norwegian: Norges Kristelige Student- og Skoleungdomslag  or NKSS), is a Christian youth organization in Norway.  Members refer to NKSS as "The team" (Norwegian: Laget).

NKSS was founded in 1924 by Lutheran theologians Carl Fredrik Wisløff and  Ole Hallesby. It works in schools and universities to make Jesus known to students.  There are around 200 registered groups, in secondary, high school, and universities. NKSS is affiliated with International Fellowship of Evangelical Students (IFES), a worldwide Christian organization which works with students around the world.
 
Laget NKSS is divided into six regions of Norway:
Region North (Finnmark, Troms, Nordland)
Region Mid-Norway (Sør-Trøndelag, Nord-Trøndelag, Møre og Romsdal)
Region West (Sogn og Fjordane, Hordaland)
Region South West (Rogaland)
Region South  (Aust-Agder, Vest-Agder)
Region East (Østfold, Akershus, Oslo, Hedmark, Oppland, Buskerud, Vestfold, Telemark)

References

External links
NKSS web page  
Laget NKSS

Christianity in Norway
International Fellowship of Evangelical Students
Christian organizations established in 1924
Christian organizations established in the 20th century
Religious organisations based in Norway
Student organisations in Norway
Student religious organizations